The 2019 Korea Open was a badminton tournament which took place at Incheon Airport Skydome in Incheon, South Korea, from 24 to 29 September 2019 and had a total purse of $400,000.

Tournament
The 2019 Korea Open was the nineteenth tournament of the 2019 BWF World Tour and also part of the Korea Open championships, which have been held since 1991. This tournament was organized by the Badminton Korea Association with sanction from the BWF.

Venue
This international tournament was held at Incheon Airport Skydome in Incheon, South Korea.

Point distribution
Below is the point distribution table for each phase of the tournament based on the BWF points system for the BWF World Tour Super 500 event.

Prize money
The total prize money for this tournament was US$400,000. Distribution of prize money was in accordance with BWF regulations.

Men's singles

Seeds

 Kento Momota (champion)
 Chou Tien-chen (final)
 Shi Yuqi (withdrew)
 Jonatan Christie (quarter-finals)
 Anders Antonsen (second round)
 Chen Long (first round)
 Viktor Axelsen (second round)
 Anthony Sinisuka Ginting (second round)

Finals

Top half

Section 1

Section 2

Bottom half

Section 3

Section 4

Women's singles

Seeds

 Akane Yamaguchi (first round)
 Chen Yufei (quarter-finals)
 Tai Tzu-ying (semi-finals)
 Nozomi Okuhara (quarter-finals)
 P. V. Sindhu (first round)
 Ratchanok Intanon (final)
 He Bingjiao (champion)
 Saina Nehwal (first round)

Finals

Top half

Section 1

Section 2

Bottom half

Section 3

Section 4

Men's doubles

Seeds

 Marcus Fernaldi Gideon / Kevin Sanjaya Sukamuljo (quarter-finals)
 Mohammad Ahsan / Hendra Setiawan (withdrew)
 Li Junhui / Liu Yuchen (semi-finals)
 Takeshi Kamura / Keigo Sonoda (final)
 Hiroyuki Endo / Yuta Watanabe (second round)
 Fajar Alfian / Muhammad Rian Ardianto (champions)
 Han Chengkai / Zhou Haodong (first round)
 Kim Astrup / Anders Skaarup Rasmussen (second round)

Finals

Top half

Section 1

Section 2

Bottom half

Section 3

Section 4

Women's doubles

Seeds

 Mayu Matsumoto / Wakana Nagahara (second round)
 Misaki Matsutomo / Ayaka Takahashi (quarter-finals)
 Yuki Fukushima / Sayaka Hirota (second round)
 Chen Qingchen / Jia Yifan (quarter-finals)
 Greysia Polii / Apriyani Rahayu (second round)
 Lee So-hee / Shin Seung-chan (final)
 Du Yue / Li Yinhui (quarter-finals)
 Kim So-yeong / Kong Hee-yong (champions)

Finals

Top half

Section 1

Section 2

Bottom half

Section 3

Section 4

Mixed doubles

Seeds

 Zheng Siwei / Huang Yaqiong (final)
 Wang Yilü / Huang Dongping (first round)
 Yuta Watanabe / Arisa Higashino (quarter-finals)
 Dechapol Puavaranukroh / Sapsiree Taerattanachai (champions)
 Chan Peng Soon / Goh Liu Ying (first round)
 Seo Seung-jae / Chae Yoo-jung (semi-finals)
 Praveen Jordan / Melati Daeva Oktavianti (quarter-finals)
 Tang Chun Man / Tse Ying Suet (first round)

Finals

Top half

Section 1

Section 2

Bottom half

Section 3

Section 4

References

External links
 Tournament Link

Korea Open (badminton)
Korea Open (badminton)
Korea Open (badminton)
Korea Open (badminton)